Earhart most often refers to American aviator Amelia Earhart. It may also refer to:

 Earhart (surname)
 3895 Earhart, a main-belt asteroid named after Amelia Earhart
 Earhart Environmental Magnet Elementary School, Wichita, Kansas
 Earhart Expressway, a state highway in Louisiana named after Fred A. Earhart
 Earhart Foundation, an American charitable foundation founded by Harry Boyd Earhart
 Earhart Hall, a Purdue University residential hall

See also
 Earhart House, Ellett, Virginia, on the National Register of Historic Places